FMA may refer to:

Arts and entertainment
 Faroese Music Awards
 Free Music Archive, a website
 Fullmetal Alchemist, Japanese manga series
 Festival du Monde Arabe de Montréal
 FMA (album), a 2016 album by Grace

Science and technology
 Fused multiply–add, a floating-point multiply–add operation
 FMA instruction set, in the x86 microprocessor instruction set
 Foundational Model of Anatomy

Law
 Financial Management and Accountability Act 1997, of Australia
 Federal Marriage Amendment, a failed proposed US Constitutional amendment

Organizations
 Fabricators & Manufacturers Association, International
 Fábrica Militar de Aviones, later Fábrica Argentina de Aviones, an aircraft manufacturer
 Monegasque Athletics Federation
 Mozambican Athletics Federation
 FMA Architects, Nigeria
 Financial Market Authority (Liechtenstein)
 Financial Markets Authority (New Zealand)
 Forestville Military Academy, in Maryland, US
 Foundation for Media Alternatives
 Future Media Architects, an internet development company

Other uses
 Financial management advisor
 Filipino martial arts
 Fellow of the Museums Association
 Formosa International Airport (IATA code), Argentina
 First-mover advantage